My Country is a 1986 Australian film about the discovery of Australia.

The film was partly shot at Monash University.

References

Australian historical drama films
1980s English-language films
1986 films
1986 television films
1980s Australian films